Martin E. Kravarik (January 20, 1936 – April 4, 2018) was an American politician who served in the New Jersey General Assembly from District 7B from 1970 to 1972.

Born in The Bronx, Kravarik grew up in Irvington, New Jersey and attended Irvington High School and Rutgers University. He was a pilot in the United States Air Force and graduated from Seton Hall University School of Law.

A longtime resident of the Kendall Park neighborhood of South Brunswick, New Jersey, Kravarik died on April 4, 2018, in Princeton, New Jersey at age 82.

References

1936 births
2018 deaths
Irvington High School (New Jersey) alumni
New Jersey lawyers
Republican Party members of the New Jersey General Assembly
People from Irvington, New Jersey
People from South Brunswick, New Jersey
Politicians from Essex County, New Jersey
Rutgers University alumni
Seton Hall University School of Law alumni
United States Air Force officers
Military personnel from New Jersey